Thomas Stuart Price Perriello (born October 9, 1974) is an American attorney, diplomat, and politician. As of January 2021, Perriello is the executive director for U.S. Programs at the Open Society Foundations.

He narrowly defeated six-term Republican incumbent Virgil H. Goode Jr. by 727 votes out of over 317,000 cast. At the time he served, the district included much of Southside Virginia and stretched north to Charlottesville. Perriello was defeated in the 2010 election by Republican State Senator Robert Hurt.

In February 2014, he was appointed United States Special Representative for the Quadrennial Diplomacy and Development Review, serving until July 2015. From July 2015 to December 2016, he was Special Envoy for the Great Lakes Region of Africa and the Democratic Republic of Congo, succeeding former U.S. Senator Russ Feingold. Perriello ran for the Democratic nomination in the 2017 Virginia gubernatorial election, but lost to Ralph Northam.

Early life and education
Thomas Stuart Price Perriello was born on October 9, 1974, in Charlottesville, Virginia, and grew up in Ivy, a small, affluent, unincorporated community west of Charlottesville. He is the son of Linda (née Gillooly), a financial analyst, and Vito Anthony Perriello Jr., a pediatrician. His paternal grandparents were Italian immigrants, and his mother is from an evangelical Christian family from Ohio. He attended Murray Elementary School, Meriwether Lewis Elementary School, Henley Middle School and Western Albemarle High School in the county school system, and then graduated from St. Anne's-Belfield School, a private school. He attained the rank of Eagle Scout in Boy Scout Troop 114 in Ivy, and was a legislative page in the Virginia House of Delegates.

He received his B.A. (1996) and J.D. (2001) from Yale University.

Early career
From 2002–2003, Perriello worked for the UN-mandated Special Court for Sierra Leone, where he eventually becoming special adviser to the prosecutor, David Crane. He has worked as a consultant to the International Center for Transitional Justice in Kosovo (2003), Darfur (2005), and Afghanistan (2007) where he worked on justice-based security strategies. Perriello has also been a fellow at The Century Foundation and consultant to the National Council of Churches of Christ.

U.S. House of Representatives

Elections
2008

Perriello won a narrow (50.1% to 49.9%) victory over Republican six-term incumbent Virgil H. Goode Jr., a longtime figure in Virginia politics who had previously represented a large portion of the district in the Senate of Virginia. Perriello had trailed Goode in the polls by 30 percent only three months before the election. Politico reported that Goode's campaign was impaired by remarks by Goode that were interpreted as anti-Muslim and by a flap over Goode's tenuous connection to a gay-themed movie.

The traditionally Democratic urban areas of the district gave Perriello significant margins over Goode.  While Goode won 13 of the 20 county-level jurisdictions in the district, Perriello won all but one independent city, Bedford, which went for Goode by only 16 votes.  Ultimately, Perriello prevailed largely on the strength of a more than 25,000 vote margin in Charlottesville and surrounding Albemarle County. Perriello's performance showed the most dramatic improvements over past Democratic voting in the more conservative areas of the district hardest hit by decades of job loss and economic slowdown. As a presidential candidate, Barack Obama also improved on past Democratic performance, but he ultimately lost this district by around 7,500 votes (2.5 percentage points). For example, Perriello significantly outperformed Obama in the district's strongly conservative southwestern portion. Ironically, this was Goode's base; he had represented much of the district's southern portion for 35 years at the state and federal level. Perriello may also have been helped by coattails from atop the ticket, as Mark Warner won the district in a landslide with 65 percent of the vote.

2010

Perriello lost to Republican nominee State Senator Robert Hurt in a race between the two and Independent candidate Jeffrey Clark. During the race, Perriello was noted for touting Democratic achievements during his two years in office rather than running from them. In recognition of his support for gun rights, Perriello received the endorsement of the National Rifle Association. He also received the endorsement of the Veterans of Foreign Wars in the race in recognition of his "strong support for veterans, national security and defense, and military personnel issues."

His reelection campaign was targeted by the national Democratic party, as the Democratic Congressional Campaign Committee sent financial resources, ads, and staff to the district in an effort to protect a seat that Perriello had won for the Democrats by a razor-thin 727 vote margin in 2008.  As early as two weeks after being elected in 2008, Perriello was targeted for defeat by national Republicans and by outside groups like the U.S. Chamber of Commerce and the Koch brothers' funded Americans for Prosperity.  His effort to maintain his seat was marked by full days of campaigning, including one period called "24 hours of Tom" in which the congressman held one or two events every hour for twenty four hours in the final weeks of the election.

Ultimately, Perriello lost by 3.9 percent, which was considered a surprisingly close result in the Republican-leaning district. As a point of comparison, Glenn Nye, another freshman Democrat in the similarly Republican-leaning Virginia's 2nd, lost by 11 points to his Republican challenger in the same cycle. The two congressmen took dramatically different approaches to campaigning, with Perriello embracing his short congressional record that included votes for progressive legislation like the Affordable Care Act, and Nye attempting to distance himself from his party.

Tenure
He narrowly defeated six-term Republican incumbent Virgil H. Goode Jr. by 727 votes out of over 317,000 cast. At the time he served, the district included much of Southside Virginia and stretched north to Charlottesville. Perriello was defeated in the 2010 election by Republican State Senator Robert Hurt.

In announcing his first bid for Congress in 2007, Perriello spoke of his conviction politics: "Conviction politics will make me more effective if I win. The first question I asked myself before deciding to run for office was not 'can I win?' but 'can I improve people's lives if I win?'" 
 
Citing the 2006 midterm elections, Perriello pointed toward the example of fellow Democrats including Senators Jim Webb, Sherrod Brown, and Jon Tester—all winning in difficult political environments with firm positions that cut across typical progressive or conservative ideologies.  Perriello framed his positions as "for the people and not for the corporate establishment" and did not focus on partisan divisions.

During his time in Congress, Perriello often explained his support for controversial votes by his standard of conviction politics. Perriello described his vote for Cap and Trade legislation as a national security imperative, stating "There's got to be something more important than getting reelected," in an interview with Politico. "If I lose my seat, and that's the worst that happens, I could live with that."

Time termed Perriello an "unapologetic progressive" in naming him one of the "new civic leaders" in its 40 under 40 issue for 2010.

Political positions

While in Congress, Perriello supported landmark legislation, including the Affordable Care Act, DREAM Act, and climate and stimulus legislation. A populist Democrat, he was an ally in Congress of President Barack Obama, although he did not always vote in support of the President's agenda. Perriello voted with the Democratic majority in the House of Representatives 90% of the time, according to a Washington Post analysis.

Perriello voted for the American Recovery and Reinvestment Act, the American Clean Energy and Security Act, and the Patient Protection and Affordable Care Act in March 2010.

Health Care: During debate over the health care bill in the House, he voted for the Stupak–Pitts Amendment to the Affordable Health Care for America Act, which would have prohibited the use of federal funds to cover any part of the costs of any health plan that includes coverage of abortion, except in cases of rape, incest or danger to the life of the mother. But Perriello later supported the final Senate version of the bill (the Patient Protection and Affordable Care Act), which did not include the Stupak-Pitts language, and has since said he regrets his vote for Stupak, calling it the "worst vote of his career."

Economic Policy: Perriello voted against the Unemployment Compensation Extension Act of 2009, because the bill extended unemployment benefits for only some states and excluded Virginia. He pressed the administration and Congress to include more infrastructure spending in the stimulus bill, and authored the Every Penny to Main Street Act, which would have used the money that banks paid back from the bailout to directly create new jobs in construction. He also repeatedly urged Democrats to introduce a comprehensive national jobs bill.

Gun Control: Perriello opposed a ban on assault weapons while in Congress.

National Security: Perriello called for "keeping America safe by working to ensure that our military is equipped with the resources, equipment, and training necessary to win the global war on terrorism." Although he cast votes for the continuation of U.S. military action in Afghanistan, he also cosponsored legislation requiring U.S. President Barack Obama to submit an exit strategy for the end of combat operations in Afghanistan. Perriello also opposed removing the U.S. military from Pakistan. In 2010, Perriello voted in support of the defense bill.

Sustainable Energy and Energy Independence: Perriello has been vocal in his support of sustainable energy solutions and energy independence. In April 2018, Perriello co-authored an opinion piece in the Washington Post with Tom Cormons, executive director of Appalachian Voices, calling on Governor Northam to support a push by landowners and environmental groups against a fracking gas pipeline through the Blue Ridge Mountains.

Hate Speech and Discrimination: Perriello strongly condemned the Unite the Right rally that occurred in Charlottesville in August 2017. Perriello wrote in Slate magazine that, “Our future will be determined by whether we speak honestly about the racial demagoguery of this White House, whether principled conservatives stop enabling the racist and authoritarian policies of the Trump administration, whether we restore the line between force and violence, and whether we have the moral and intellectual courage to engage honestly with our past.” On the one year anniversary of the rally in 2018, Perriello said that while the impact of the rally remains to be seen, the event “could prove to be a wake-up call that inspired a more inclusive and just community and country.”    He also strongly emphasized a need for white Americans to actively speak out and demonstrate against racism, in order to counter the narrative of white supremacists.

Post-congressional career

Center for American Progress 
After losing his congressional seat, Perriello served as president and CEO of the Center for American Progress Action Fund and as a counselor for policy at Center for American Progress where he spoke out on issues of immigration reform, voting rights, inequality, and campaign finance reform.

U.S. Department of State

Secretary of State John Kerry tapped Perriello to lead the 2015 Quadrennial Diplomacy & Development Review, a strategic planning process intended to be conducted every four years for the U.S. Department of State and the U.S. Agency for International Development (USAID). The two agencies have a budget of more than $50 billion and 80,000 employees. The resulting document, Enduring Leadership in a Dynamic World, set out four strategic priorities for American diplomacy and foreign assistance: preventing conflict and violent extremism, promoting democratic societies, advancing inclusive economic growth, and mitigating climate change. It also identified ways to make the agencies more efficient, including improving the use of data and diagnostics.

In 2015, President Obama appointed Perriello to succeed former U.S. Senator Russell Feingold (D-Wisc.) as Special Envoy to the Great Lakes Region and the Democratic Republic of Congo. As Special Envoy, Perriello was the U.S. representative to a region including Democratic Republic of Congo, Burundi, and Rwanda, countries working to overcome a recent legacy of civil war and genocide. Perriello was charged with implementing the administration's policies of preventing mass atrocities and supporting the emergence of peaceful, democratic societies.

In the Democratic Republic of Congo, Perriello worked closely with the national council of Catholic bishops to support mediation between the president and opposition groups over a political crisis triggered when the president attempted to stay in office beyond his constitutional term.  This work culminated in the historic New Year's Eve agreement on December 31, 2016, which lays out a path to the first peaceful transition of power since the country's independence in 1960. He later wrote about the political challenges facing Congo in the Washington Post.

2017 gubernatorial campaign

On Jan 5, 2017, Perriello announced that he would run for Governor of Virginia in the 2017 election on a platform centered around economic justice as well as resistance to the Trump Administration.  In his campaign, he championed robust policies for addressing the racial wealth gap, reproductive health, resurgent monopolies, and corruption.

A group of more than 30 former Obama staffers signed a letter endorsing Perriello for governor, including Obama's 2008 campaign manager David Plouffe and former White House Senior Adviser Dan Pfeiffer. They were joined by Senator and former presidential candidate Bernie Sanders, who subsequently appeared with Perriello at a George Mason University rally. Other individuals and organizations who endorsed Perriello, included Our Revolution, a Sanders' affiliated group; Khizr and Ghazala Khan; the Progressive Change Campaign Committee; Sen. Elizabeth Warren (D-Mass.); John Podesta, the chairman of Hillary Clinton's 2016 presidential campaign; and Center for American Progress and Center for American Progress Action Fund President and CEO Neera Tanden.

Perriello ran for the Democratic nomination against Virginia's Lieutenant Governor, pediatric neurologist and former state senator Ralph Northam, who prior to Perriello's entrance into the race had been endorsed by Virginia Senators Mark Warner and Tim Kaine; Virginia Governor Terry McAuliffe; Virginia Representatives Robert C. "Bobby" Scott, Don Beyer, and A. Donald McEachin; Virginia Attorney General Mark Herring; and the full membership of the Virginia Democratic House and Senate Caucuses.

Throughout the race, Perriello faced criticism from NARAL (which endorsed Northam) because of Perriello's 2009 vote in favor of prohibiting federal funding for abortion coverage in insurance plans subsidized under the Affordable Health Care for America Act—a vote which Perriello has claimed was an attempt to keep a promise to constituents in his conservative, mostly rural district. Perriello has since apologized repeatedly for the vote, calling it a "bad vote and a bad pledge," while promising that he sees abortion as a "fundamental right" that should be accessible to all women.

Perriello criticized Northam for having twice voted for George W. Bush—votes that Northam said occurred at a time when he was largely apolitical, prior to his first run for office.

Perriello refused to accept campaign contributions from Dominion Energy, a state-regulated utility and Virginia's biggest political donor. Northam accepted over $100,000 in donations from the company and its executives.

On June 13, 2017, Northam defeated Perriello in the primary. Perriello then immediately congratulated Northam on his victory on Twitter. Perriello became CEO of Win Virginia, a PAC dedicated to helping Democrats win back the Virginia House of Delegates in 2017.

In an interview with the New Yorker, Perriello said that his single biggest takeaway from the campaign was “whichever party ends up figuring out how to speak about two economic issues—automation and monopoly—will not only be doing right by the country but will have a massive electoral advantage.”

Open Society Foundations 
Open Society announced on October 10, 2018, that Perriello would become executive director of the Foundations' U.S. Programs starting November 12, 2018.

The work of Open Society Foundations' U.S. Programs is organized around four central goals: a more inclusive and accountable American democracy; a fair criminal justice system; full political, economic, and civic participation of communities of color and immigrants; and equitable economic growth.

“I am thrilled to announce this new leadership for U.S. Programs, at such a critical juncture in the United States,” said Patrick Gaspard, president of the Open Society Foundations. “Our institutions are under attack, the rule of law is being challenged as seldom before in our history, and the very foundations of our democracy are under enormous stress. These times demand bold leadership, new ideas, and sharp strategic thinking. In Tom and Cecilia [Munoz], we have a promising partnership to lead our work in the U.S. forward.”

References

External links 

 

|-

|-

|-

1974 births
Living people
21st-century American politicians
Candidates in the 2017 United States elections
Democratic Party members of the United States House of Representatives from Virginia
People from Ivy, Virginia
Politicians from Charlottesville, Virginia
United States Special Envoys
Virginia lawyers
Yale Law School alumni